Capricorn is the ninth studio album by Taiwanese singer Jay Chou, released on 14 October 2008 by JVR Music.

At the 20th Golden Melody Awards, the album was nominated for eight awards, winning Best mandarin Male Singer, Song of the Year for "Fragrant Rice", Best Music Video for "Magician".

The tracks, "Fragrant Rice", "Give Me the Time of a Song", and "The Promised Love", are listed at number 3, number 17, and number 56 respectively on the 2008's Hit FM Top 100 Singles of the Year chart.

Track listing
English names adopted from JVR website.

Awards

Certifications

References

External links
  Jay Chou discography@JVR Music

2008 albums
Jay Chou albums
Sony Music Taiwan albums